Evan McPherson (born July 21, 1999) is an American football placekicker for the Cincinnati Bengals of the National Football League (NFL). He played college football at Florida before being drafted by the Bengals in the fifth round of the 2021 NFL Draft, the only kicker to be selected that year. 

During the Bengals' 2021 playoff run, McPherson tied Adam Vinatieri for most field goals made in a single postseason, with 14, and set the record for most postseason field goals made without any misses. Due to his clutch kicking, McPherson is nicknamed "Shooter" (after the Happy Gilmore character of a similar nickname) and "Money Mac."

He owns the Bengals franchise record longest field goal with a 59-yard field goal he made in 2022.

Early career
McPherson started his football career at Fort Payne High School in Fort Payne, Alabama, where he spent four seasons as the team's kicker and punter. At Fort Payne, he made a 60-yard field goal and an 84-yard punt, both kicks being one yard short of the Alabama high school record. He also made the first-team All-State in 2017. 

McPherson went on to play college football at Florida from 2018–2020 before choosing to forgo his senior season and enter the NFL draft.  At Florida, McPherson was 51-of-60 (85.0%) on field goals, setting a Southeastern Conference record for career field goal percentage (minimum 50 attempts), and 149-of-150 on extra points. He made 5 of 8 career field goal attempts from at least 50 yards.  In his three seasons with the Gators, the team recorded a 29–9 record and a 2–1 record in bowl games, including an Orange Bowl win in 2019.  McPherson made all three of his field goal attempts in that game, the longest from 49 yards.

At the time he left Florida, his career field goal percentage ranked 12th in NCAA history.

Professional career

McPherson was drafted by the Cincinnati Bengals in the fifth round, 149th overall, of the 2021 NFL Draft. He signed his four-year rookie contract with the Bengals on May 17, 2021.

2021

McPherson was a perfect 5/5 on field goals during the Bengals' three 2021 preseason games, including a 57-yard kick.  At the end of the pre-season, the Bengals released their only other kicker on the roster, Austin Seibert, and named McPherson the starter for the 2021 regular season.  McPherson became the first player from Fort Payne High School ever to play in an NFL regular season game.

McPherson made his first regular-season field goal attempt, a 53-yarder, in the season-opener against the Minnesota Vikings on September 12, 2021. During overtime, McPherson kicked a 33-yard game-winning field goal to secure a 27–24 win, earning AFC Special Teams Player of the Week. On November 21, McPherson tied an NFL record by making three field goals from over 50 yards in one game, going 4/4 on kicks from 54, 53, 51, and 47 yards in a 32–13 win over the Las Vegas Raiders, securing his second AFC Special Teams Player of the Week award in the process. He also set the franchise record for most 50-yard field goals made in a season, breaking the old record of 4 set by Horst Muhlmann in 1970. On December 19, McPherson set the franchise record for longest field goal for the Bengals with a 58-yard kick against the Denver Broncos.

McPherson finished the season 28-of-33 on field goal attempts (84.8%), including being 9-of-11 on field goals (81.8%) from 50+ yards. In the Bengals' Wild Card game against the Las Vegas Raiders, McPherson was 4-of-4 on field goals, assisting the team to a 26–19 victory that gave them their first postseason win in 31 years. Subsequently, in the Divisional Round game, he again made 4-of-4 field goals, including two from over 50 yards. His 52-yard field goal as time expired gave the Bengals a 19–16 win over the Tennessee Titans to send them to their first AFC Championship Game since 1988. McPherson also became the first kicker in NFL history to kick at least 4 field goals in multiple games during the same postseason. In the AFC Championship Game against the Kansas City Chiefs, McPherson was again 4-of-4 on his field goal attempts, including a game winning 31-yard field goal in overtime in the 27–24 win, advancing the Bengals to Super Bowl LVI, where he kicked two more field goals in the 23–20 loss. McPherson's 14-of-14 playoff field goals set the record for most field goals made by a rookie, as well as ties the all-time record for most field goals made in a single postseason.  His 12 combined 50+ yard field goals in the regular season and playoffs also set the NFL record for most combined regular season and postseason 50+ yard field goals made by one player in a single season.

2022

In the Bengals season opening game against the Pittsburgh Steelers, McPherson set a franchise record for longest field goal with 59 yards. However, after an injury to long snapper Clark Harris, McPherson had a potential game-winning extra point blocked and missed a 29-yard field goal in overtime, leading to a 23–20 loss. In Week 4, McPherson converted both field goal attempts and all three extra points in a 27–15 win over the Miami Dolphins, earning AFC Special Teams Player of the Week. In week 6, McPherson kicked a 52-yard field goal in the Bengals 30–26 win over the New Orleans Saints. McPherson finished the season making 82.8% of his field goals, with a perfect 5/5 on field goals from 50+ yards. However, he missed 4 extra points during the season, as well as one in the playoffs.  Still, he remained perfect on postseason field goals, making all his attempts in the Bengals three playoff games to push his record up to 19/19.

NFL career statistics

Regular season

|-
! style="text-align:center;"| 2021
! style="text-align:center;"| CIN
| 16 || 28 || 33 || 84.8% || 0 || 58 || 46 || 48 || 95.8% || 91 || 63.9 || 55 || 130
|-
! style="text-align:center;"| 2022
! style="text-align:center;"| CIN
| 16 || 24 || 29|| 82.8% || 0 || 59 || 40 || 44 || 90.9% || 49 || 62.6 || 37 || 112
|-
|- class="sortbottom"
! colspan="2"| Career || 25 || 39 || 48 || 81.3% || 0 || 59 || 86 || 92 || 93.4% || 140 || 63.3 || 92 || 186
|}

Postseason

|-
! style="text-align:center;"| 2021
! style="text-align:center;"| CIN
| 4 || style="background:#e0cef2; width:3em;"| 14 || 14 || 100.0% || 0 || 54 || 6 || 6 || 100.0% || 24 || 64.5 || 16 || 48
|- class="sortbottom"
! colspan="2"| Career || 4 || 14 || 14 || 100.0% || 0 || 54 || 6 || 6 || 100.0% || 24 || 64.5 || 16 || 48
|}

Personal life
McPherson is a Christian. McPherson is married to Gracie Groat.

McPherson's older brother Logan was also an all-state kicker for Fort Payne High School and went on to play as a punter for Louisiana Tech University. His younger brother Alex made an All-State as a kicker with Fort Payne in 2019, and as a punter in 2020. In 2021, Alex announced his commitment to attend Auburn University. Alex was the highest-ranked kicker in the 2022 class.

References

External links
Cincinnati Bengals bio
Florida Gators bio

1999 births
Living people
American football placekickers
Cincinnati Bengals players
Florida Gators football players
People from Fort Payne, Alabama
Players of American football from Alabama
Christians from Alabama